Boulder Bank Lighthouse is a decommissioned 19th century lighthouse located near the Port Nelson end of the Boulder Bank. It was New Zealand's second permanent lighthouse.

Prior to its construction, the Nelson harbour entrance, with its four-metre tidal range and narrow curved channel, was a trap to unwary ship's captains. The octagonal cast-iron tower was manufactured in sections by Stothert & Pitt, an engineering firm from Bath, England, in 1859 at a cost of £2,824 (equivalent to £ as of ). It was then shipped to New Zealand on board the Glenshee, and was erected in 1862.

It is registered with Heritage New Zealand as a category I structure with registration number 41.

The lighthouse was lit for 120 years, from 1862 until 1982. It was given a fresh coat of white paint in October 2018.  Its perch on the natural breakwater makes it popular with tourists. Today, it stands alone, but was not always so. When it was manned by lighthouse keepers, a number of homes, other buildings and radio mast clustered around its base.

See also 

 List of lighthouses in New Zealand

References

External links 
 

Heritage New Zealand Category 1 historic places in the Nelson Region
Buildings and structures in Nelson, New Zealand
Lighthouses completed in 1862
Lighthouses in New Zealand
1860s architecture in New Zealand
Transport buildings and structures in the Nelson Region